K. Raghavendra Hitnal (born 1 June 1979) is a politician from the state of Karnataka. He is a member of Indian National Congress. He won twice as MLA from Koppal assembly constituency.

Personal life 
He is the son of former politician K. Basavaraj Hitnal. He married Smt Rachana, and has a son and a daughter. His brother Rajasekhar Hitnal unsuccessfully contested from Koppal in the general elections 2019.

Career 
He is a close aide of former chief minister Siddaramaiah. He contested in general assembly elections in 2013 & 2018 from Koppal and won the seat by defeating Karadi Sanganna Amarappa.

References 

Living people
1979 births
Indian National Congress politicians
People from Karnataka
People from Koppal district
Indian National Congress politicians from Karnataka